The 2020 season saw Southern Vipers compete in the new 50 over Rachael Heyhoe Flint Trophy following reforms to the structure of women's domestic cricket in England. The side topped the South Group of the competition, winning all six of their matches, therefore progressing to the final, where they played Northern Diamonds. The Vipers went on to become the inaugural winners of the Rachael Heyhoe Flint Trophy as they won  by 38 runs, with bowler Charlotte Taylor taking 6/34. Taylor was the leading wicket-taker in the tournament, with 15 wickets, whilst Vipers captain Georgia Adams was the leading run-scorer, with 500 runs.

After the ending of the Women's Cricket Super League in 2019, the ECB announced the beginning of a new "women's elite domestic structure". Eight teams were included in this new structure, with Southern Vipers being one of two teams that had their brand retained as a domestic regional hub. Due to the impact of the COVID-19 pandemic, only the Rachael Heyhoe Flint Trophy was able to take place. Southern Vipers were captained by Georgia Adams and coached by former Vipers player Charlotte Edwards, and played their home matches at the Rose Bowl and the County Ground, Hove.

Squad
Southern Vipers announced their squad for the season on 14 August 2020. Georgia Elwiss withdrew from the squad due to injury and was replaced by Charlotte Taylor. Age given is at the start of Southern Vipers' first match of the season (29 August 2020).

Rachael Heyhoe Flint Trophy

South Group

 Advanced to the Final.

Fixtures

Final

Statistics

Batting

Bowling

Fielding

Wicket-keeping

References

Southern Vipers seasons
2020 in English women's cricket